Ren Jun (died 204), courtesy name Boda, was a military officer serving under the warlord Cao Cao in the late Eastern Han dynasty of China.

Life
Ren Jun was from Zhongmu County, Henan Commandery which is present-day Zhongmu County, Henan. He was probably born sometime in the mid or late Eastern Han dynasty.

In 189, the tyrannical warlord Dong Zhuo took advantage of the power vacuum, created in the aftermath of the conflict between the regent He Jin and the eunuch faction, to seize control of the Han central government and hold the figurehead Emperor Xian hostage in the imperial capital, Luoyang. Yang Yuan, the Prefect of Zhongmu County, started panicking and wanted to abandon his post and leave. Ren Jun advised him to stay and urged him to take the lead in calling for everyone to rise up against Dong Zhuo and overthrow him. When Yang Yuan asked him what he should do, Ren Jun advised him to assume the position of acting Intendant of Henan, bring all the counties in Henan Commandery under his leadership, and rally as many men as possible to form an army to fight Dong Zhuo's forces. Yang Yuan appointed Ren Jun as his Registrar and proceeded to implement his suggestions.

Around the time (late 189 to early 190), the warlord Cao Cao had raised an army to join a coalition of warlords on a campaign against Dong Zhuo. When he entered Zhongmu County, the various officials in Henan Commandery could not decide on whether they should follow Cao Cao. After discussing with Zhang Fen, Ren Jun decided that they should all follow Cao Cao, so he led all the soldiers recruited in Henan Commandery to join Cao Cao's army. He also gathered all his family members, relatives, servants and retainers, numbering a few hundred people in total, and brought them along to join Cao Cao. Cao Cao was so pleased to gain such support from Ren Jun that he appointed him as a Cavalry Commandant. He also arranged for Ren Jun to marry one of his second cousins and treated Ren Jun as a close aide.

Since then, whenever Cao Cao went on military campaigns against rival warlords, he put Ren Jun in charge of logistics and the provision of supplies for his troops at the frontline. In 196, he received Emperor Xian and brought him to his base in Xu County (許縣; present-day Xuchang, Henan), which became the new imperial capital. Cao Cao effectively gained control over the Han central government and the figurehead emperor. Around the time, when a famine broke out and there were insufficient food supplies, an official Zao Zhi suggested implementing the tuntian system of agriculture to produce a sustainable supply of grain for Cao Cao's growing army. Cao Cao heeded Zao Zhi's suggestion and appointed Ren Jun as Agriculture General of the Household to supervise the implementation of the tuntian system. Within years, the tuntian system turned out to be a success as the granaries became fully stocked with grain.

In 200, during the Battle of Guandu between Cao Cao and his rival Yuan Shao, Ren Jun was in charge of logistics and transportation of weapons, equipment, supplies, etc., to the frontline. After Yuan Shao's forces attacked Cao Cao's supply trains on a number of occasions, Ren Jun organised the supply trains into groups of 1,000 wagons and arranged for them to travel along several different routes heavily protected by camps and pickets. Yuan Shao's forces did not dare to attack Cao Cao's supply trains after that.

Although Zao Zhi was the one who came up with the idea of the tuntian system, Cao Cao thought that Ren Jun deserved the highest credit for the success of the system because he was the one who supervised its implementation. He thus proposed to the Han imperial court to commend Ren Jun for his achievement by enfeoffing him as a Marquis of a Chief Village with a marquisate of 300 taxable households. Later, he promoted Ren Jun to the position of a Changshui Colonel.

Ren Jun died in 204. Cao Cao shed tears when he learnt of Ren Jun's death.

Family
Ren Jun's eldest son, Ren Xian, inherited his father's peerage and marquisate. As he had no son to succeed him, his marquisate was abolished after his death.

In late 220, Cao Cao's son and successor Cao Pi usurped the throne from Emperor Xian, ended the Eastern Han dynasty, and established the state of Cao Wei with himself as the new emperor. After his coronation, Cao Pi awarded Ren Jun the posthumous title "Marquis Cheng" to honour him for his contributions. He also enfeoffed Ren Lan, another of Ren Jun's sons, as a Secondary Marquis.

Appraisal
Ren Jun was known for being generous, understanding and magnanimous. Cao Cao highly regarded him and often heeded his advice and suggestions. During times of famine, Ren Jun provided much assistance to his friends, acquaintances and distant relatives and did not hesitate to use his personal wealth to help the needy and poor. He gained much respect and admiration from the people for his kindness.

See also
 Lists of people of the Three Kingdoms

Notes

References

 Chen, Shou (3rd century). Records of the Three Kingdoms (Sanguozhi).
 
 Sima, Guang (1084). Zizhi Tongjian.

Year of birth unknown
204 deaths
Generals under Cao Cao
Han dynasty politicians from Henan
Politicians from Zhengzhou